Rabeya Chowdhury is a prominent Bangladesh Nationalist Party politician. She is one of the Vice Chairperson of Bangladesh Nationalist Party (BNP), and also the Comilla District BNP President. She is a former Member of the Jatiya Sangsad for three terms from a reserved seat.

Early life
Chowdhury was born into a well-reputed Bengali Muslim family from Batgram in Comilla District. She was the daughter of prominent politician Ashrafuddin Ahmad Chowdhury and poet Razia Khatun Chowdhurani. Her grandfather, Tofazzal Ahmad Chowdhury Anu Mian, was an influential zamindar in the area. She married Nasiruddin Chowdhury (d. 20 May 2020), a former honorary magistrate, with whom she had two sons and a daughter.

Career
Rabeya Chowdhury is a senior leader in Bangladesh Nationalist Party (BNP), a vice chairperson in BNP's Central Committee and also Comilla District BNP President. She has been a prominent leader in the formation and organization of BNP in Comilla District and one of the top female leaders in the party nationally. Chowdhury was elected to parliament from reserved seat as a Bangladesh Nationalist Party candidate in 1979, 1991 and 2005.

References

Bangladesh Nationalist Party politicians
Living people
Women members of the Jatiya Sangsad
8th Jatiya Sangsad members
Year of birth missing (living people)
2nd Jatiya Sangsad members
5th Jatiya Sangsad members
6th Jatiya Sangsad members
People from Comilla District
20th-century Bangladeshi women politicians
21st-century Bangladeshi women politicians